Borhanuddin is a town in Bhola District in the division of Barisal, Bangladesh. It is the administrative headquarter and urban centre of Borhanuddin Upazila.

See also
Borhanuddin Upazila
List of municipal corporations in Bangladesh

References

Populated places in Bhola District